Gadiel A. Miranda is a judoka from Puerto Rico. He won a silver medal in the -81 kg division at the 2010 Central American and Caribbean Games judo competition . In 2011 he participated in the Pan American Games at Guadalajara, Mexico and won another silver medal. In 2014 Central American and Caribbean Games judo competition he won a bronze medal in Veracruz, Mexico.

References

Puerto Rican male judoka
Living people
Judoka at the 2011 Pan American Games
Year of birth missing (living people)
Pan American Games medalists in judo
Pan American Games silver medalists for Puerto Rico
Judoka at the 2015 Pan American Games
Medalists at the 2011 Pan American Games
21st-century Puerto Rican people